is a Japanese voice actress.

Filmography

Anime series

Anime films

Original video animation

Video games

Dubbing

Live-action

Animation

References

External links
 Official profile 
 
 
 

1996 births
Living people
Voice actresses from Kanagawa Prefecture
Japanese video game actresses
Japanese voice actresses
81 Produce voice actors